Hungarian president László Sólyom was not allowed to step on Slovak soil on August 21, 2009, as he was about to attend the unveiling of a statue of St. Stephen, the first king of Hungary (1000–1038), in Komárno, Slovakia, a town near the Hungarian border, where ethnic Hungarians form the majority of the population.

The only official reason given for the denial was that the Hungarian president's visit might have constituted a security risk. Slovak prime minister Robert Fico had claimed that police would be unable to prevent Slovak extremist groups from disturbing the ceremony.

In the two days preceding the visit, Slovakia had raised four other objections to the planned trip:
 The ceremony might suggest a claim of Hungarian sovereignty over Slovak soil.
 Slovakia was informed late about the visit.
 The date of the visit fell one day after the Hungarian national holiday commemorating St. Stephen and coincided with the Warsaw Pact invasion of Czechoslovakia.
 Slovak leaders were not invited, nor did the president have plans to meet with them.

Declaring the Hungarian head of state an unwelcome person (essentially persona non grata, although this term was not used) created additional diplomatic conflict in already tense Hungary–Slovakia relations.

Purpose of the planned visit
László Sólyom was invited by a civic association, Szent István Szobor Bizottság ("St. Stephen Statue Committee"), to a statue unveiling ceremony in Komárno, Slovakia.

Both the Catholic and the Orthodox churches regard King Stephen as a saint for his role in converting the peoples of his kingdom to Christianity. Pope Gregory VII canonized him, his son and a bishop; August 20, 1083, the day of the canonization, is a public holiday in Hungary, regarded as the foundation of Hungarian statehood. In his Admonitions to his son, he declared, as cited in the planned speech of Sólyom for the unveiling:
 The Komárno statue was due to be unveiled on the day after this anniversary, that is, on August 21, 2009.

The erection of the statue itself was criticized in February 2009 by the extremist and nationalist Slovak National Party (SNS), one of the parties in Slovakia's governing coalition, because the town had not erected statues of Saints Cyril and Methodius, two Byzantine Greek missionaries among the Slavic peoples of Great Moravia and Pannonia. The statue was consequently placed only on the balcony of the Matica Slovenská, a cultural and scientific institution focusing on Slovakia-related topics.

Objections of Slovakia against the visit

Security risk

Slovak Prime Minister Robert Fico said on August 19 that he could not prevent Sólyom from entering the country and sent a letter to the Hungarian embassy warning of potential security risks, saying that his Direction – Social Democracy party government would not prevent extremists of the nationalist Slovenská pospolitosť (Slovak Brotherhood) from going there to demonstrate.

According to the Ministry of Foreign Affairs of Hungary, there were no real security risks involved around the ceremony:

Date

Two days before the planned visit, the Slovak parliamentary foreign affairs committee called the trip "a diplomatic provocation" because of the August 21 date, although the date was chosen by the mayor of Komárno, not by Sólyom. 
August 21 is the anniversary of the Warsaw Pact invasion of Czechoslovakia led by the Soviet Union after the 1968 Prague Spring. Being a Warsaw Pact state, the People's Republic of Hungary also sent troops into Slovakia; Poland and Bulgaria also took part in the Soviet putsch.

Slovak Prime Minister Robert Fico compared László Sólyom to the soldiers invading Czechoslovakia: "In 1968 Hungarian tanks were coming to Slovakia. Now it's someone in a fancy limousine."

Hungarian prime minister Bajnai telephoned his Slovak counterpart on the phone to reassure him that the visit was unconnected with the 1968 events and reminding him that in 2008, the 40th anniversary of the Prague Spring, Sólyom had made a speech officially expressing his regret at the 1968 invasion.

However some in the Slovak press questioned if Fico were truly troubled by the date; the Slovak paper SME wrote:

Late notification
On June 19, 2009, Sólyom had notified Peter Weiss, Slovakia's ambassador to Hungary, of the planned visit, regarded as the "highest level of official notification" in diplomacy. Sólyom's office stated that Slovakia had mentioned no objections to the trip until the week of the planned visit.:

Slovak Prime Minister Robert Fico called this statement a lie, claiming that Hungary only informed Slovakia on August 13. Foreign Minister of Hungary, Péter Balázs retorted that the named date, August 13, was the start of the technical preparations and not the notification, which had happened on June 19.

Stressing Hungarian statehood in inappropriate circumstances

The three main leaders of Slovakia Ivan Gašparovič (President of the Republic), Robert Fico (Prime Minister) and Pavol Paska (Chairman of the Parliament) stated in a common declaration that the visit is a "deliberate provocation against Slovakia".

The Ministry of Foreign Affairs of Hungary noted:

No plans of meeting Slovak leaders
Slovaks have criticised Sólyom for not inviting Slovak leaders to the ceremony or meeting them somewhere else, even though Sólyom was not the organizer of the ceremony, as it was organized by the town of Komárno. 
Previously, the Slovak diplomatic establishment informed the Hungarian diplomatic establishment that Ivan Gašparovič, the head of state of Slovakia would be on vacation on the day of the visit. Gašparovič declared earlier that he would only accept any invitations if the town also erects statues of Saints Cyril and Methodius.
Neither Gašparovič nor Fico distanced themselves from government party leader Ján Slota for his earlier comments disparaging Saint Stephen, the king portrayed by the Komárno statue, as a "clown on a horse". Fico made further attacks on Saint Stephen and also said Slovaks should not consider him as their king.

Timeline of events

June 19
On June 19, László Sólyom met the new ambassador of Slovakia to Hungary, Peter Weiss. On this meeting Sólyom informed Weiss about the planned ceremony he was invited to, and that he intends to go there.

August 13
On August 13, the bilateral technical preparations to the ceremony began.

August 19
Two days before the planned visit, on August 19, the committee of foreign affairs of the Slovak Parliament called the trip a diplomatic provocation because of the date August 21, anniversary of the Warsaw Pact invasion of Czechoslovakia.

Ivan Gašparovič, President of the Slovak Republic called the visit an "inconsiderate decision", stating to the press that he is not surprised because he knows Sólyom "likes to prowl around" in the countries that are in the area of the pre-1920 Kingdom of Hungary.

Back then, Fico said they can not and will not prevent Sólyom from entering the country.

August 20

On August 20, Miroslav Lajčák, Minister of Foreign Affairs of Slovakia officially informed Antal Heizer, ambassador of Hungary in Bratislava that László Sólyom is not recommended to cross the border on the next day. He also called Péter Balázs, Hungarian Minister of Foreign Affairs on the phone about the issue.

August 21

On Friday, August 21, Ivan Gašparovič, President of the Slovak Republic asked László Sólyom to think over the visit.

He said if despite the message, Sólyom decides to visit the unveiling, Slovak authorities must do everything to protect him.

László Sólyom sent a message to Gašparovič in which he indicated that he maintains his intentions about unveiling the statue. He wrote in the message that he informed Slovakia in time and no objections have been raised earlier about the date. He also made clear that he already expressed his regret about the aggression against Czechoslovakia in a public speech on the 40th anniversary in 2008.

Denial of entry
Slovak Prime Minister Robert Fico announced in the afternoon, hours before the unveiling that Sólyom will be not allowed to enter the territory of Slovakia. The document stating this was sent to the Hungarian embassy in Bratislava.

Fico also told the press that Slovak authorities would not prevent the president from crossing the border by physical force, but they will consider it as a serious provocation if he still enters Slovakia. Miroslav Lajčák, Slovak Minister of Foreign Affairs said the relations of Hungary and Slovakia have already been harmed by this issue.

On the border Ján Packa, executive of the police of Slovakia and a great number of policemen were waiting.

President Sólyom did not enter Slovakia, after the embassy received a document stating that Sólyom is refused entry into Slovakia:

He walked to the middle of the bridge over the Danube leading from Hungarian Komárom to Slovak Komárno and held a press conference about the events on the Hungarian side of the border. He stated:

Ceremony in absence of Sólyom
The news stating that Sólyom is not allowed to enter Slovakia, was received with loud whistling among the gathered 2000-3000 people on the square where the statue was about to be unveiled.

The speeches before the unveiling were about the needed cooperation, and encouraged peace between the two countries, which was received with applause by the mainly Hungarian celebrators.

A few Slovak protesters attended the ceremony, with signs saying among others "Sólyom, go home".

Antal Heizer, ambassador of Hungary in Bratislava read the planned ceremonial speech of László Sólyom to the crowd.

Hungarian politicians of Slovakia took part in the ceremony, among others the mayor of the town, Tibor Bastrnák.

Reactions of Hungarian diplomatic establishment 
The government of Hungary called the ban "unexpected", "unfounded" and its justification "deplorable" and "unacceptable".

Péter Balázs Hungarian Minister of Foreign Affairs - cutting his vacation short - called in the Slovak ambassador Peter Weiss and protested the unprecedented act coming from an EU and NATO member state. Péter Balázs asked for explanation.

The chairman of the Committee of Foreign Affairs of the Parliament of Hungary, Zsolt Németh declared:

He also claimed that it is the duty of the international community to find a way of driving Slovakia back to the road of respecting human rights and minority rights.

The political parties of Hungary have also protested against the Slovak decision. The governing Hungarian Socialist Party (MSZP) said, it is definitely Slovakia who is responsible for the worsened relations, who as a young nation state seek their identity, which sometimes turns into fierce nationalism.

Legal disputes
According to Péter Balázs, the ban was not lawful, because the already given international permissions haven't been withdrawn and so the embassy just got an "unfriendly" document, which would in theory have allowed Sólyom to enter Slovakia. He also said the Slovak diplomacy has turned international law "upside down" by leaving the international permissions while banning Sólyom personally, as a civilian. He stated that Hungary plans to inform the EU and a broader international public about this "rude" political action.

Legality confirmed
On 6 March 2012 Advocate General at the European Court of Justice Yves Bot gave an opinion on the legality of the ban. He concluded that the visit was not a private but an official one and as such was not covered by the free movement provisions of the EU law. Diplomatic relations are governed exclusively by the member states and follow the international law under which visits by the heads of states depend on the consent of the host state. The court, dismissing the action brought by Hungary, followed the general line of reasoning of the Advocate General.

Media coverage

Slovakia
In the Slovak press, the opinions were divided about the move of the Slovak government. Those sympathizing with the government have generally agreed with the move. Dag Daniš of Pravda wrote:

More liberal and less pro-government papers have also condemned the Slovak reaction, not only Sólyom. As Peter Morvay of SME wrote:

Most of these media empires are regularly accused of being the sole advocates of the opposition (fueled mostly by the prime minister's attacks on the media). Yet numerous members of the opposition have agreed with the ban. Mikuláš Dzurinda, president of the leading opposition party SDKÚ has been quoted to say that Sólyom is instigating conflicts. Pavol Abrhán, member of the opposite KDH has suggested that a diplomatic note should be sent to Hungary.

Czech Republic

The Czech media was amongst the first comment on the topic blaming both sides for the situation that arose. Mladá Fronta Dnes columnist Magdalena Sodomková wrote:

Another daily, Lidové noviny wrote an article in a similar tone:

See also
 Hungary–Slovakia relations
 An unofficial Hungarian translation of the diplomatic note sent to László Sólyom (by the Office of the President of Hungary)

References

Political controversies in Europe
Hungary–Slovakia relations
2009 in international relations
2009 in Slovakia
August 2009 events in Europe